Ghulam Mohiuddin Hajni (21 June 1917  21 January 1993) was a Kashmiri writer, critic, political activist and teacher. He wrote in regional and foreign languages such as Urdu, Persian, Arabic and primarily in Kashmiri language. In 1970, he became the recipient of Sahitya Akademi Award for his research publication titled Maqalati Hajini.

He translated One Thousand and One Nights (often known as Alif Laila), into Kashmiri language, and sometimes used to wrote radio dramas and poetry. During his career, he criticised the political doctrine of Sheikh Abdullah, 3rd chief ministers and 2nd prime minister of Jammu and Kashmir.

Education and background 
He was born on 21 June 1917 at Hajin village of Bandipora district in Jammu and Kashmir princely state. He attended Sopore School and then obtained Bachelor’s degree from S.P College, Srinagar. He later went to Uttar Pradesh where he obtained master’s degree in Arabic from Aligarh Muslim University. After completing master's, he obtained Bachelor of Laws degree and diploma in Journalism. He also taught at S.P College until he retired from the service.

Literary work 
Besides his appearance in Kashmiri and other non-native literatures, he was involved in resistance literature, writing in protest of Dogra rule. He wrote Grees Sund Ghara (Peasant's House), the first resistance radio play written in Kashmiri language, which was published in 1917. Later, it appeared in 1939 in a journal and fifteen years later in a book. The play is also known for its Shakespeare's writing style ever written in Kashmiri literature.

In 1954, he wrote Koshur Reader for the
Directorate of School Education. In later years following his 1954 publications, he wrote a monograph titled Wahab Parray, in 1959 which was published by Jammu and Kashmir Art and Cultural Academy. In 1960, he wrote a book titled
Kashir Shairi, comprising a collection of Kashmiri poetry published by the Sahitya Akademi. Later in 1961, his another book titled Kashiri Nasrach Kitab was the bestselling book of that time. In 1962, he wrote Gaman Manz Pheeri Pheeri (travelling through the villages) which depicted him as
journalist travelling across the Kashmiri villages. In 1967, he wrote a research book titled Maqalat, comprising a collection of essays that revolves around different aspects of Kashmiri literature and language.

Work

Political activities 
During the 1930s, the princely state, in modern-day Jammu and Kashmir union territory witnessed protests against Dogra dynasty. He participated in protests during his school days. He was later arrested and is claimed was "lashed 24 times on his buttocks”. His activities were also reported to Bakshi Ghulam Mohammad, 2nd prime minister of Jammu and Kashmir. The authorities detained him between 1948 and 1965 for his involvement in political activities.

Death 
He died on 21 January 1993. He is buried in a cemetery located in his village Hajin, Bandipora. In 2019, the government of Jammu and Kashmir proposed the establishment of two degree colleges in Hajin and Ajas areas and named the two after him.

References 

1917 births
1993 deaths
People from Bandipore district
Aligarh Muslim University alumni
Social workers from Jammu and Kashmir
Poets from Jammu and Kashmir
Recipients of the Sahitya Akademi Award in Kashmiri